Leda may refer to:

Mythology 
 Leda (mythology), queen of Sparta and mother of Helen of Troy in Greek mythology

Places 
 Leda, Western Australia, a suburb of Perth, Western Australia
 Leda makeshift settlement, Bangladesh, a refugee camp for Rohingya refugees fleeing persecution in Myanmar
 Leda, Burkina Faso, a town
 Leda, Adamawa State, Nigeria, a village - see List of villages in Adamawa State
 Leda (river), a tributary of the Ems in Germany
 Leda Ridge, Antarctica

Astronomy 
 Leda (moon), a moon of Jupiter
 38 Leda, an asteroid
 Leda, the original proposed name for exoplanet Thestias
 Lyon-Meudon Extragalactic Database, an astronomical catalog of galaxies
 Large Aperture Experiment to Detect the Dark Ages, a radio interferometer

Entertainment 
 Leda: The Fantastic Adventure of Yohko, a 1985 Japanese OVA
 Web of Passion, a French film released in the US as Leda
 Project Leda, a set of female clones in the TV series Orphan Black

Ships 
 Leda-class frigate, a type of frigate in the British Royal Navy
 HMS Leda, six ships of the British Royal Navy
 TS Leda, a North Sea ferry
 Leda (1807 ship), an English merchant ship and West Indiaman

Persons 
 Leda Cosmides (born 1957), American psychologist
 Leda Gloria (1912–1997), Italian film actress
 Leda Luss Luyken (born 1952), Greek/American conceptual artist, who lives and works in German
 Leda Mileva (1920–2013), Bulgarian writer, translator and diplomat
 Leda Nagle (born 1951), Brazilian journalist and TV presenter
 Leda Sanford (born 1933), author, speaker, former publisher and former advertising director
 Ferdinando Leda (born 1980), Brazilian football player

Other uses 
 Leda clay, also called quick clay, a unique form of marine clay
 LEDA, ICAO code for Lleida–Alguaire Airport
 Library of Efficient Data types and Algorithms (LEDA)
 Leda, genus of Algae

See also 
 Leda and the Swan (disambiguation)